Ulitsa Gorchakova is a station on the Butovskaya Line of the Moscow Metro system in Moscow, Russia. It was opened on 27 December 2003 along with four other stations. The station is located in Yuzhnoye Butovo District, between two other stations of the same line, Bulvar Admirala Ushakova and Buninskaya Alleya.

Name
The station, which name literally means Gorchakov Street, was named after the nearby street, and the street was named after the 19th-century Russian diplomat Alexander Gorchakov.

Location
The station is located at the intersection of Gorchakova Street and Chernyovskaya Street. It has only one exit, located at the eastern side of the station.

Building
As most of the other stations in Butovskaya Line, Ulitsa Gorchakova station is built on an elevated viaduct. There is an escalator leading to the exit. The station is built in open air and has a roof. It is separated from the nearby buildings by barriers for sound isolation. The architect of the station was Leonid Borzenkov.

References

Moscow Metro stations
Railway stations in Russia opened in 2003
Butovskaya Line